Efua Traoré is a Nigerian-German story writer. She won the regional Commonwealth Short Story Prize in 2018 and was nominated for the Waterstones Children's Book Prize in 2022.

Life and career
Traoré was born and raised in a small town in the south of Nigeria. She has also resided in France and Germany. 

She won the Africa regional Commonwealth Short Story Prize for her short story "True Happiness" in 2018. In 2019, her debut novel "Children of the Quicksands" won The Times/Chicken House Children’s Fiction Competition. The novel was also shortlisted for the Waterstones Children's Book Prize in 2022. 

She received the Munich Literaturreferat YA Literature grant 2019 for her German novel Die Hüter des Schlafes (The Guardians of Sleep).

Books
 Children of the Quicksands (2021) — a fantasy novel published by The Chicken House
 The House of Shells (2022) — a children's novel published by The Chicken House

Awards

References

External links
 Official website

German people of Nigerian descent
Nigerian women novelists
Year of birth missing (living people)
Nigerian children's writers
Living people